Naeem Saddam (born 15 August 1969) is an Iraqi football midfielder who played for Iraq between 1988 and 1993. He is the younger brother of Karim Saddam. Naeem played in the Iraqi Asian Youth Championship winning side in Doha, Qatar in 1988 and scored the winner against Norway in the World Youth Cup in Saudi Arabia in 1989. He was also part of the Iraqi side that nearly qualified for the World Cup in 1994.

Career statistics

International goals
Scores and results list Iraq's goal tally first.

References

External links
 

1969 births
Living people
Sportspeople from Baghdad
Iraqi footballers
Iraq international footballers
Al-Quwa Al-Jawiya players
Association football midfielders